Dobrin Ragin (born 29 January 1970) is a former Bulgarian footballer who played as a forward.

Career

Ragin spent the majority of his playing career in Bulgaria, winning a Bulgarian Cup with Loko Sofia in 1995. He was also the top scorer in the B PFG in 2000, netting 24 times for Iskar Sofia.

References

1970 births
Living people
Footballers from Sofia
Bulgarian footballers
Association football forwards
FC Lokomotiv 1929 Sofia players
PFC Slavia Sofia players
First Professional Football League (Bulgaria) players
Bulgarian expatriate footballers